Hankley Farm is a  biological Site of Special Scientific Interest (SSSI) west of Elstead in Surrey.

This sandy arable field has been designated an SSSI because of its large population of a nationally endangered plant, red-tipped cudweed. This was formerly a common weed on arable fields, but it has been in sharp decline since the 1960s. The colonies in the site and neighbouring fields may represent as much as 50% of the British population.

The site is private land with no public access.

References

Sites of Special Scientific Interest in Surrey